The Pac-12 Conference is a collegiate athletic conference, that operates in the Western United States, participating in 24 sports at the  NCAA Division I level. Its football teams compete in the Football Bowl Subdivision (FBS; formerly Division I-A), the highest level of college football in the nation.

The conference's 12 members are located in the states of Arizona, California, Colorado, Oregon, Utah, and Washington. They include each state's flagship public university, four additional public universities, and two private research universities.

The modern Pac-12 conference formed after the disbanding of the Pacific Coast Conference (PCC), whose principal members founded the Athletic Association of Western Universities (AAWU) in 1959. The conference previously went by the names Big Five, Big Six, Pacific-8, and Pacific-10. The Pac-12 moniker was adopted in 2011 with the addition of Colorado and Utah.

Nicknamed the "Conference of Champions", the Pac-12 has won more NCAA national championships in team sports than any other conference in history. The top three schools with the most NCAA team championships are members of the Pac-12: Stanford, University of California, Los Angeles (UCLA) and University of Southern California (USC), respectively. Washington's national title in women's rowing in 2017 was the 500th NCAA championship won by a Pac-12 school.

On June 30, 2022, amid the broader 2021–22 NCAA conference realignment, UCLA and USC announced plans to leave the Pac-12 for the Big Ten Conference starting in 2024.

Member schools

Full members
The Pac-12 has twelve full member institutions. Football used to be the only sport where the conference is split into two divisions, the North Division and the South Division.

The Pac-12's members are spread evenly between 3 regions, with 4 schools each in California, the Pacific Northwest, and the Four Corners region.

Notes

Affiliate members 
The Pac-12 has three affiliate member institutions in California and one in Arkansas.

Notes

Future affiliate members 
The Pac-12 women's lacrosse league will add two affiliate members, both from California, in the 2024 season (2023–24 school year). San Diego State, already a men's soccer member, will add women's lacrosse to its Pac-12 membership.

Former members
No school has left the Pac-12 since its founding as the AAWU in 1959. Two members of the PCC were not invited to join the AAWU or its successors.

Former affiliate members 

Notes

Facilities

Key personnel

†Private institution not required to release coaching salaries
•Salaries based on 2022–2023 academic year

Academics
Nine of the twelve member schools are members of the Association of American Universities (AAU) as of 2019, including all four California-based schools, as well as at least one university in each state that has a Pac-12 member university. This is the second-highest number of AAU universities among FBS conferences (behind only the Big Ten Conference).
 University of Arizona
 University of California, Berkeley
 University of California, Los Angeles
 University of Colorado Boulder
 University of Oregon
 University of Southern California
 Stanford University
 University of Washington
 University of Utah

Additionally, these member schools are also highly ranked nationally and globally by various groups, including the Academic Ranking of World Universities (ARWU) and Times Higher Education World University Rankings (Times).

Athletic department revenue by school
Total revenue includes ticket sales, contributions and donations, rights and licensing, student fees, school funds and all other sources including TV income, camp income, concessions, and novelties. Total expenses includes coach and staff salaries, scholarships, buildings and grounds, maintenance, utilities and rental fees, recruiting, team travel, equipment and uniforms, conference dues, and insurance.

The following table is updated to show institutional reporting to the Department of Education as shown on the DOE Equity in Athletics website for the 2020–21 academic year. Due to COVID-19, expenses for 2020-21 may have been uncharacteristically low for some institutions.

Apparel

History

Pacific Coast Conference

The roots of the Pac-12 Conference go back to December 2, 1915, when the Pacific Coast Conference (PCC) was founded at a meeting at the Imperial Hotel in Portland, Oregon. Charter members were the University of California (now University of California, Berkeley), University of Washington, University of Oregon, and Oregon Agricultural College (now Oregon State University). The PCC began play in 1916.

One year later, Washington State College (now Washington State University) joined the league, followed by Stanford University in 1918.

In 1922, the PCC expanded to eight teams with the admission of USC and Idaho. Montana joined the Conference in 1924, and in 1928, the PCC grew to 10 members with the addition of UCLA.

For many years, the conference split into two divisions for basketball and baseball – a Southern Division comprising the four California schools and a Northern Division comprising the six schools in the Pacific Northwest.

In 1950, Montana departed to join the Mountain States Conference. The PCC continued as a nine-team league through June 1959.

AAWU (Big Five and Big Six)
Following "pay-for-play" scandals at California, USC, UCLA, and Washington, the PCC disbanded in June 1959. Ten months earlier in  August 1958, these four schools agreed to form a new conference that would take effect the following summer. When the four schools and Stanford began discussions for a new conference in 1959, retired Admiral Thomas J. Hamilton interceded and suggested the schools consider creating a national "power conference" (Hamilton had been a key player, head coach, and athletic director at Navy, and was the current athletic director at Pittsburgh). Nicknamed the "Airplane Conference," the five former PCC schools would have played with other major academically-oriented schools, including Army, Navy, Air Force, Notre Dame, Pitt, Penn State, and Syracuse. The effort fell through when a Pentagon official vetoed the idea and the service academies backed out.

On July 1, 1959, the new Athletic Association of Western Universities was launched, with California, UCLA, USC, and Washington as the four charter members. Stanford joined during the first month.  Hamilton left Pittsburgh to become the first commissioner of the AAWU, and remained for twelve years. The conference also was popularly known as the Big Five from 1960 to 1962. When Washington State joined in 1962, the conference became informally known as the Big Six. The new league inherited the PCC's berth in the Rose Bowl; since 1947, the PCC champion had received an automatic bid to the bowl.

Pacific-8
Oregon and Oregon State joined in the summer of 1964. With their addition, the conference was known unofficially as the Pacific Athletic  and then the Pacific-8 (as there already was a major conference called the Big Eight). In 1968, the AAWU formally renamed itself the Pacific-8 Conference, or Pac-8 for short. The Pac-8 did not allow a second bowl team from the conference until the 1975 season; in basketball, participation in the National Invitation Tournament (NIT) was not allowed until 1973.

Idaho was never invited to join the AAWU; the Vandals were independent for four years until the formation of the Big Sky Conference in 1963, and were independent in football until 1965.

Pacific-10

In 1978, the conference added Arizona and Arizona State from the Western Athletic Conference, becoming the Pacific-10 Conference or Pac-10. The invitations to the schools were extended in December 1976, and the expansion formally announced in May 1977.

In 1986, the Pac-10 began sponsoring women's athletics. Prior to this time members' women's teams competed with other large universities on the Pacific coast in either the Northern Pacific Conference or the Western Collegiate Athletic Association.

In the mid-1990s the conference expressed interest in admitting the University of Colorado and the University of Texas after the collapse of the Southwest Conference. Texas expressed an interest in joining a strong academic conference, but joined three fellow Southwest Conference schools (Texas A&M, Texas Tech, and Baylor) to merge with the Big Eight Conference to form the Big 12 Conference in 1996. Colorado elected to remain in the newly formed Big 12.

Before the addition of Colorado and Utah in 2011, only the Ivy League had maintained its membership for a longer time than the Pac-10 among Division I conferences. Commissioner Larry Scott said on February 9, 2010, that the window for expansion was open for the next year as the conference began negotiations for a new television deal. Speaking on a conference call to introduce former Big 12 commissioner Kevin Weiberg as his new deputy, Scott talked about possibly adding new teams to the conference and launching a new television network. Scott, the former head of the Women's Tennis Association, took over the conference in July 2009. In his first eight months on the job, he saw growing interest from the membership over the possibility of adding teams for the first time since Arizona and Arizona State joined the conference in 1978.

Pac-12

In early June 2010, there were reports that the Pac-10 was considering adding up to six teams to the conference: the University of Texas, Texas A&M University, Texas Tech University, the University of Oklahoma, Oklahoma State University, and the University of Colorado.

On June 10, 2010, the University of Colorado Boulder officially accepted an invitation to join the Pac-10 Conference, effective starting with the 2012–2013 academic year. The school later announced it would join the conference a year earlier than previously announced, in the 2011–2012 academic year.

On June 15, 2010, a deal was reached between Texas and the Big 12 Conference to keep Texas, Texas A&M, Texas Tech, Oklahoma, and Oklahoma State in the Big 12. Following Texas' decision, the other Big 12 schools that had been rumored candidates to join the Pac-10 announced they would remain in the Big 12. This deal effectively ended the Pac-10's ambition to potentially become a sixteen-team conference.

On June 17, 2010, the University of Utah officially accepted an invitation to join the Pac-10 Conference, effective starting July 2011. Utah was a member of the Western Athletic Conference (WAC) with Arizona and Arizona State before those two left for the Pac-10 in 1978. The Utes left an expanded WAC with seven other schools in 1999 to form the new Mountain West Conference. Utah became the first "BCS Buster" to join a BCS conference, having played in (and won) two BCS games beforehand.

On July 27, 2010, the conference unveiled a new logo and announced that the Pac-10 would be renamed the Pac-12 when Utah and Colorado formally joined in July 2011. On October 21, the Pac-12 announced that its football competition would be split into two divisions—a North Division comprising the Pacific Northwest and Bay Area schools, and a South Division comprising the Mountain Time Zone and Southern California schools. On July 1, 2011, the Pac-12 assumed its current alignment when both Colorado and Utah officially joined as full members.

On August 15, 2012, the conference debuted the Pac-12 Network. It was the third college sports conference to launch a dedicated network, and the first to completely fund and own their own network outright. Since 2014, the conference has been headquartered in San Francisco, California, with the conference moving to working remotely once the lease expires in June 2023. It had been based in the nearby East Bay suburb of Walnut Creek since the late 1970s.

NCAA conference realignment (2021–present) 

On August 24, 2021, the Pac-12, ACC, and Big Ten announced the formation of a "historic alliance" that would bring their member institutions "together on a collaborative approach surrounding the future evolution of college athletics and scheduling." The formation of this alliance between 3 of the Power Five conferences was in response to Oklahoma and Texas announcing plans to leave the Big-12 and join the SEC. The alliance included an inter-conference scheduling component for football and men's and women's basketball. In 2021, the Pac-12 paid $19.8 million to its member schools, the lowest distribution in the Power Five.

On June 30, 2022, UCLA and USC announced their departure to the Big Ten Conference beginning in the 2024–25 academic year.

Membership timeline

The Pac-12 claims the PCC's history as its own. Not only does it maintain the automatic bid from the Rose Bowl inherited from the PCC, but the eight largest schools in the old PCC all eventually joined the new league. However, the old PCC operated under a separate charter.

The Pac-12 is one of the founding members of the Mountain Pacific Sports Federation (MPSF), a conference organized to provide competition in non-revenue Olympic sports. All-Pac-12 members participate in at least one MPSF sport (men's and women's indoor track and field both actually have enough participating Pac-12 schools for the conference to sponsor a championship, but the Pac-12 has opted not to do so). For certain sports, the Pac-12 admits certain schools as associate members.

Sponsored sports
The Pac-12 Conference sponsors championship competition in 10 men's and 13 women's NCAA-sanctioned sports, plus one men's sport that is not sanctioned by the NCAA. Four schools are associate members, each in a single men's sport.

The newest sport to be sponsored by the Pac-12 is women's lacrosse, which began play in spring 2018 following the elevation of Arizona State's club team to full varsity status.

 ^ — Beach volleyball is a fully sanctioned NCAA sport which held its first national championship in the spring of 2016. The Pac-12 is the second conference (after the ASUN Conference) to sponsor a championship in the sport.
 † — Rowing (M) is sanctioned by the Intercollegiate Rowing Association, not by the NCAA; Rowing (W) is sanctioned by both.

Men's sponsored sports by school
Member-by-member sponsorship of the 11 men's Pac-12 sports.

Men's sports that are not sponsored by the Pac-12 but are fielded as a varsity sport at Pac-12 schools

Notes

Women's sponsored sports by school
Member-by-member sponsorship of the 13 women's Pac-12 sports.

Women's sports that are not sponsored by the Pac-12 but are fielded as a varsity sport at Pac-12 schools

Notes

NCAA national titles

Team titles through December 5, 2022; individual titles through July 1, 2016

† Co-ed sports include fencing (since 1990), rifle, and skiing (since 1983). Team fencing championships before 1990 and team skiing championships before 1983 were awarded as men's or women's championships and are counted here as such.

These totals do not include football national championships, which the NCAA does not officially award at the FBS level. Various polls, formulas, and other third-party systems have been used to determine national championships, not all of which are universally accepted. These totals also do not include championships prior to the inception of the NCAA.

USC claims 11 national football championships, California claims 5, Washington claims 2, Stanford claims 2, while Colorado and UCLA claim 1.

Conference champions

 Football
 Men's basketball
 Women's basketball
 Baseball
 Softball
 Gymnastics
 Men's soccer
 Women's soccer
 Women's volleyball

Football

Rivalries
Each of the ten schools that were conference members before 2011 has its own in-state, conference rivalry. One is an intracity rivalry (UCLA-USC) and another is within the San Francisco/Oakland metropolitan area (California-Stanford). Colorado and Utah, who joined in 2011, were historic rivals in the Rocky Mountain region prior to 1962 when they suspended the series. These rivalries (and the name given to the football forms) are:

 Arizona–Arizona State – The winner receives the Territorial Cup.
 California–Stanford – Known as the Big Game, the winner receives the Stanford Axe.
 Colorado–Utah – Known as the Rumble in the Rockies.
 Oregon–Oregon State – Though not officially recognized by the universities, the Platypus Trophy is awarded to the winning alumni association.
 UCLA–USC – The winner receives the Victory Bell. The two universities compete across all sports for the SoCal BMW Crosstown Cup.
 Washington–Washington State – Known as the Apple Cup, the winner receives Apple Cup trophy.

The most frequently played rivalries in the conference are between Oregon and Oregon State (124 meetings through 2020) and Big Game between Stanford and California (123 meetings). These rivalries are among the most played rivalries in college football.

The two newest members, Colorado and Utah, had a football rivalry that had been dormant since 1962 – both were conference rivals previously in the Rocky Mountain Athletic Conference (now a Division II conference) and later the now-defunct Mountain States Conference (also known as the Skyline Conference). Even after Colorado joined what became the Big 12 in 1948 (the conference was then known popularly as the Big 7 Conference), the two schools continued their football rivalry for over a decade before ending it after the 1962 season. With the two schools being placed in the same division for football starting in 2011, the rivalry was revived with their 58th meeting during the 2011 season.

All of the California schools consider each other major rivals due to the culture clash between Northern and Southern California. California and UCLA have a rivalry rooted in their shared history as the top programs within the University of California system. Stanford and USC have a rivalry rooted in their shared history as the only private schools in the Pac-12. California and USC also have a long history, playing each other beginning in 1915.

The Pacific Northwest schools of Oregon, Oregon State, Washington, and Washington State all consider each other major rivals due to their proximity and long history; a sweep of the other 3 teams is known as the Northwest Championship. The Oregon–Washington rivalry is sometimes referred to as the Border War.

Arizona and New Mexico have a recently renewed rivalry game, based upon when they were both members of the WAC and both states were longtime territories before being admitted as states in 1912. They played for the Kit Carson Rifle trophy, which was no longer used starting with their meeting in the 1997 Insight Bowl.

USC and Notre Dame have an intersectional rivalry (See Notre Dame–USC rivalry). The games in odd-numbered years are played in South Bend in mid-October, while the games in even-numbered years are played in Los Angeles, usually in late November.

Stanford and Notre Dame also have an intersectional rivalry (See Notre Dame–Stanford football rivalry). The schedule of the Stanford–Notre Dame rivalry mirrors that of USC–Notre Dame. The games in even-numbered years are played at Notre Dame in mid-October, while the games in odd-numbered years are played at Stanford in late November.

The isolated rural campuses of Washington State and Idaho are eight miles (13 km) apart on the Palouse, creating a natural border war known as the Battle of the Palouse. Idaho rejoined FBS in 1996 and was a member until 2017.

Utah and BYU have a fierce rivalry nicknamed the Holy War that goes back to 1896.

Colorado also has a rivalry with in-state rival Colorado State called the Rocky Mountain Showdown.

With the NCAA permanently approving 12-game schedules in college football beginning in 2006, the Pac-10—alone among major conferences in doing so—went to a full nine-game conference schedule. Previously, the schools did not play one non-rival opponent, resulting in an eight-game conference schedule (four home games and four away). In 2010, the last season before the arrival of Colorado and Utah, the only other BCS conference that played a round-robin schedule was the Big East. The schedule consisted of one home and away game against the two schools in each region, plus the game against the primary in-state rival.

Divisions

On October 21, 2010, the Pac-10 announced the creation of divisions and a championship game in football, to be used when Colorado and Utah joined the conference effective July 1, 2011. The twelve members were split into two divisions for football only: a North Division comprising the Pacific Northwest and Bay Area schools, and a South Division comprising the Mountain Time Zone and Los Angeles schools.

A nine-game conference schedule was maintained, with five games within the assigned division and four games from the opposite division. The four California teams, noted in the table in gray, still played each other every season— consequently, the four non-California teams in each division will only play one of the two California teams from the opposite division each year.

The Pac-12 Football Championship Game featured the North Division Champion against the South Division Champion for the first 11 years of its existence, with divisional champions determined based on record in all conference games (both divisional and cross-divisional). However, on May 18, 2022, the NCAA Division I Council announced that conferences would no longer be required to maintain divisions in order to hold a conference championship. As a result, later that same day, the Pac-12 announced that it would eliminate its divisions for the 2022 football season and beyond, with the championship game instead featuring the two Pac-12 teams with the highest winning percentage. It was the first FBS conference to scrap its divisions as a result of this change.

Bowl games
As of the 2023 college football season, the following is the selection order of bowl games with Pac-12 tie-ins. If a Pac-12 team is selected to participate in the College Football Playoff, all other bowl-eligible teams move up one spot in the order.

Pac-12 All-Century Football Team

In honor of the 100th anniversary of the establishment of the conference, an All-Century Team was unveiled on December 2, 2015, voted on by a panel of coaches, players, and the media.
 Quarterbacks: John Elway, Stanford; Marcus Mariota, Oregon; Jim Plunkett, Stanford; Andrew Luck, Stanford; Matt Leinart, USC
 Running backs: Marcus Allen, USC; O. J. Simpson, USC; Charles White, USC; Reggie Bush, USC; Mike Garrett, USC
 Wide receivers: Keyshawn Johnson, USC; Lynn Swann, USC; Marqise Lee, USC; J. J. Stokes, UCLA; Ken Margerum, Stanford
 Tight ends: Tony Gonzalez, California; Charle Young, USC;
 Offensive line: Jonathan Ogden, UCLA; Ron Yary, USC; Tony Boselli, USC; Anthony Muñoz, USC; Lincoln Kennedy, Washington; Brad Budde, USC; Randall McDaniel, Arizona State
 Defensive ends: Tedy Bruschi, Arizona; Terrell Suggs, Arizona State; Willie McGinest, USC; Andre Carter, California; Jim Jeffcoat, Arizona State
 Defensive tackles: Steve Emtman, Washington; Haloti Ngata, Oregon; Rob Waldrop, Arizona; Leonard Williams, USC; Ed White, California
 Linebackers Junior Seau, USC; Jerry Robinson, UCLA; Ricky Hunley, Arizona; Richard Wood, USC; Chris Claiborne, USC
 Cornerbacks Joey Browner, USC; Mel Renfro, Oregon; Chris McAlister, Arizona; Antoine Cason, Arizona
 Safeties: Ronnie Lott, USC ; Kenny Easley, UCLA; Troy Polamalu, USC; Mark Carrier, USC
 Kicker: Jason Hanson, Washington State
 Punter: Tom Hackett, Utah
 Returner: Reggie Bush, USC
 Coach: John McKay, USC

Note: Bold Italic notes Offensive, Defensive and Coach of the Century selections; The voting panel was made up of 119 former players, coaches and media.

Men's basketball

Rivalries in other sports

All of the intra-conference rivalries in football are carried over into other sports.

During the 1970s, UCLA and Notre Dame had an intense men's basketball rivalry. For several years, it was one of a small number of non-conference games in Division I basketball that was played twice a season (home-and-away). The most famous game in the rivalry was on January 19, 1974, when Notre Dame scored the last 12 points of the game to nip UCLA and end the Bruins' record 88-game winning streak. This rivalry is now dormant, partly because Notre Dame is no longer independent in sports other than football (now in the ACC).

In baseball, there are intense rivalries between the four southern schools. Arizona, Arizona State, and USC have long and successful histories in baseball and all have won national titles in the sport. The most intense series is widely regarded to be the "Basebrawl" series between USC and Arizona State in 1990. Arizona State swept the series and in the final game a bench clearing brawl spread quickly to the stands and made national headlines. Several were injured and riot police were called to end the fracas.

Washington and California have a longstanding rivalry in men's crew as the two traditionally dominant programs on the West Coast.

Due to the unique geographic nature of the Pac-12 teams, the teams travel in pairs for road basketball games. For example, on Thursday, February 28, 2008, USC played Arizona and UCLA played Arizona State. Two nights later the teams switched and USC played Arizona State and UCLA played Arizona. The teams are paired as follows: USC and UCLA (the L.A. teams), Arizona and Arizona State (the Arizona teams), California and Stanford (the Bay Area teams), Washington and Washington State (the Washington teams), Oregon and Oregon State (the Oregon teams), and Colorado and Utah (the Rocky Mountain teams). Usually, the games are played on Thursdays and Saturdays with a game or occasionally two on Sundays for television purposes. This pairing formula is also used in women's volleyball. To make scheduling simpler for men and women's basketball (a sport in which each conference member uses a single venue for both teams' home games), the schedule for women's basketball is the opposite of the men's schedule. For example, when the Oregon schools are hosting the men's teams from the Arizona schools, the Arizona schools host the women's teams from Oregon schools the same weekend.

This formula has made a tradition in conference play to keep track of how a team does against a particular region; and stats are kept as to how successful a team is against, for example, "the Bay Area schools" at home or away. Effective in the 2011–12 season, with the expansion into 12 teams, a 10-year rotation model has been developed to maintain the existing 18-game conference schedule. Teams remained paired with their regional rival. Each school plays its regional rival and six other teams both home and away, and the other four teams once – two at home and two away. The newest members, Colorado and Utah, are paired with each other. The single play opponents rotate every two years.

Recently, Cal Poly and UCLA has grown into a competitive Men's Soccer rivalry with Cal Poly hosting UCLA in a 0–0 tie in front of a crowd of 8,717 which at the time was the 9th largest regular season, on-campus attendance in the history of college soccer.  The schools have played several times since however UCLA has not returned to San Luis Obispo for a Friday or Saturday game since tying Cal Poly in front of a record crowd. UCLA leads the series 6–2–2.

Olympians
While the PAC-12 is known as the "Conference of Champions," for having won the most collegiate Championships than any other Conference, it could also be considered the "Conference of Olympians" for having the most athletes and medal-winners of any conference in the history of the Olympic games.

In a 2017 study by OlympStats, USA Olympians and the medals they won were counted and sorted by their college affiliations. Stanford lead all schools with 289 athletes, 408 games, and 282 total medals won. UCLA was second, USC was third, California was 4th, Harvard was 5th in each category, respectively.

Leading the country with the most participants in their respective events are, Colorado in Alpine Skiing and Cycling, Arizona State in Archery and Badminton, Stanford in Baseball, Rugby, Swimming, Tennis and Water Polo, UCLA in Basketball, Beach Volleyball, Gymnastics and Softball, USC in Athletics and Volleyball, and Utah in Freestyle Skiing.

Since 1924 a PAC-12 school has led the country in number of athlete in each and every Summer Olympic Games to date (as of this study in 2017).

Commissioners
Since restarting in 1959 as the AAWU, the Pac-12 has had five commissioners:

{|class="wikitable sortable"
|-
! Name
! Years
! Tenure
! Conference name(s)
|-
|Thomas J. Hamilton||1959–1971||align=right|12 years ||AAWU / Pacific-8
|-
| Wiles Hallock  || 1971–1983 || align=right|12 years || Pacific-8 / Pacific-10
|-
| Thomas C. Hansen  || 1983–2009 || align=right|26 years || Pacific-10
|-
| Larry Scott  || 2009–2021 || align=right|12 years || Pacific-10 / Pac-12
|-
| George Kliavkoff || 2021–present || align=right| years || Pac-12
|}

PCC
Commissioners of the forerunner PCC
 Herb Dana (193x–40)
 Edwin N. Atherton (1940–44)
 Victor O. Schmidt  (1944–59)

See also
 Pac-12 Network
 List of American collegiate athletic stadiums and arenas
 List of U.S. colleges and universities by endowment

Notes

References

External links
 

 
Sports in the Western United States
Articles which contain graphical timelines
1959 establishments in the United States
Sports leagues established in 1959